Christel Schaldemose (born 4 July 1967) is a Danish politician who has been serving as a Member of the European Parliament since 2006. She is a member of the Social Democrats, part of the Party of European Socialists.

In parliament, Schaldemose is a member of the Committee on Internal Market and Consumer Protection (IMCO) and the Committee on Culture and Education (CULT).

Early life and career
Schaldemose has a masters in history from the University of Southern Denmark. She has worked professionally with adult education and popular enlightenment on national and regional level. Her previous job was secretary general of the Danish Adult Education Council.

Member of the European Parliament, 2006–present
Schaldemose has been a Member of the European Parliament since 2006. She has since been serving on the Committee on the Internal Market and Consumer Protection, where she is the S&D group’s coordinator. In this capacity, she works on consumer, cultural and education policy. From 2016 until 2017, she was also part of the Committee of Inquiry into Emission Measurements in the Automotive Sector. Since 2021, she has been the parliament's rapporteur on the Digital Services Act (DSA).

In addition to her committee assignments, Schadelmose has been a member of the Parliament's delegation for relations with Japan since 2009. She is also a member of the MEP Heart Group (sponsored by the European Heart Network (EHN) and the European Society of Cardiology (ESC)), a group of parliamentarians who have an interest in promoting measures that will help reduce the burden of cardiovascular diseases (CVD); the European Parliament Intergroup on LGBT Rights; and the European Parliament Intergroup on the Welfare and Conservation of Animals.

On 4 May 2008, Schaldemose launched the citizen's initiative "Females in Front" with MEPs from other EU countries. The campaign demands that at least one woman is appointed to one of the four top positions in the EU to be filled in 2009. She also led an initiative requiring all consumer products to indicate their country of origin (products made in the EU could indicate “Made in the EU” instead).

Personal life
Schaldemose lives in Copenhagen with her husband and three children (born 1996 to 2003).

References

External links 
 
 femalesinfront.eu

1967 births
Living people
Social Democrats (Denmark) MEPs
MEPs for Denmark 2009–2014
MEPs for Denmark 2004–2009
MEPs for Denmark 2014–2019
MEPs for Denmark 2019–2024
21st-century women MEPs for Denmark
People from Odense
University of Southern Denmark alumni